"Voice of God" is a song by Dante Bowe, which was released as a standalone single, on September 30, 2020. The song features vocals from Steffany Gretzinger and Chandler Moore. Bowe co-wrote the song with Jeff Schneeweis, Mitch Wong, and Tywan Mack. Bowe and Tywan Mack handled the production of the single.

"Voice of God" peaked at No. 36 on the US Hot Christian Songs chart. "Voice of God" was nominated for the GMA Dove Award Gospel Worship Recorded Song of the Year at the 2021 GMA Dove Awards. It was nominated for the Grammy Award for Best Gospel Performance/Song at the 2022 Grammy Awards.

Background
Dante Bowe shared the message behind the song on his social media, saying:

Composition

Accolades

Commercial performance
"Voice of God" debuted at number 36 on the US Hot Christian Songs chart, and at number 22 on the Christian Digital Song Sales chart.

Music video
Dante Bowe released the music video of "Voice of God" via YouTube on September 30, 2020. The video showcases Bowe, Steffany Gretzinger and Chandler Moore singing together.

Track listing

Charts

Release history

References

External links
  on PraiseCharts

2020 singles
2020 songs
Dante Bowe songs
Chandler Moore songs
Songs written by Dante Bowe